Michée Chauderon (died 1652) was an alleged Genevan witch. She was the last person to be executed for sorcery in the city of Geneva in the Republic of Geneva.

Chauderon worked as a washerwoman. At one point, she had an argument with one of her employers, who accused her of theft. They then reported her for having summoned a demon into the body of their daughter. Chauderon was arrested and interrogated. The so-called devil's mark was found on her body, and she was tortured with the strappado. During the torture, she said that one day, she had met Satan in her garden in the shape of a black man with the feet of a cow, and he had promised her wealth if she denounced God, which she had done. She was then judged guilty of sorcery, and sentenced to be hanged and burned.

Between 1520 and 1681, 340 people were put on trial for sorcery in Geneva, and 150 were executed. Chauderon was the last person to be executed for sorcery in the Republic of Geneva. The last person to be executed for sorcery in Switzerland was Anna Göldi in 1782.

References

 Home.datacomm.ch
 Maitre.cles.free.fr
 Michel Porret, L'Ombre du diable. Michée Chauderon, dernière sorcière exécutée à Genève pour sorcellerie, Genève, Georg, 2009

17th-century people from the Republic of Geneva
Executed people from the Republic of Geneva
People executed for witchcraft
Executed women
People executed by burning
Torture victims
1652 deaths
Year of birth unknown
Witch trials in the Republic of Geneva